Anatoliy Vladimirovich Kaminski (born 15 March 1950 in Baley, Russian SFSR) is an ethnic Ukrainian and a politician from Transnistria, former speaker of Pridnestrovian Supreme Soviet and former chairman of the political party Obnovlenie (Renewal).

Personal life
Kaminski was born in 1950 in eastern Russia, but his family was of Ukrainian-Polish descent. His family moved to the Moldavian SSR in 1957. Kaminski studied in Odesa, Ukraine, at the M.V. Lomonosov Odessa Institute of Technology. He subsequently worked as a manager at several dairy plants in the MSSR. Entering local politics in 1990, Kaminski became a full-time politician only upon his election to the national parliament in 2000.

Kaminski is married and has two children.

Political career
Kaminski's first political office was as a member of the council of the city of Rîbnița from 1990 until 2000, when he was elected to parliament. In 2005, he was re-elected in an election that proved to be a victory for his party. Kaminski was subsequently elected as vice-speaker, with Yevgeny Shevchuk, also of the Obnovlenie party, becoming speaker.

On 22 July 2009, Shevchuk resigned as speaker and Kaminski was elected unopposed to replace him. The newly elected vice-speaker is Mikhail Burla, chairman of Obnovlenie.

President of South Ossetia Eduard Kokoity awarded Kaminski the "Order of Friendship" on 12 March 2010, "for a great personal contribution to the development of friendship between the peoples of South Ossetia and Transnistria, merits in strengthening inter-parliamentary cooperation and for his 60-year birthday". 

In the December 2011, Kaminski ran for president of Transnistria as the candidate of Obnovlenie. In the first round of elections, he received 26.48% of the vote, narrowly making it into the second round of voting. Yevgeny Shevchuk, the former chairman of the Supreme Soviet, received the most support with 38.53%, while sitting president, Igor Smirnov, came in third with 24.82%. In the election, United Russia, the ruling political party of Russia, supported Kaminski's campaign.

External links
 Official biography page, from Parliament 
 English version of the same page

References

1950 births
Living people
People from Zabaykalsky Krai
Members of the Supreme Council (Transnistria)
Obnovlenie politicians
Transnistrian people of Ukrainian descent
Transnistrian people of Polish descent